Long Beach is a town in Michigan Township, LaPorte County, Indiana,  United States. As of the 2010 census, the population of Long Beach was 1,179. It is included in the Michigan City, Indiana-La Porte, Indiana Metropolitan Statistical Area.

History
Long Beach was founded in the 1920s as a resort town. It was named for the sand beaches of Lake Michigan.

The Hoover-Timme House (1929), John and Isabel Burnham House (1934), and Lowell E. and Paula G. Jackson House (1938), were listed on the National Register of Historic Places in 2013.

Geography

Demographics

2010 census
As of the census of 2010, there were 1,179 people, 555 households, and 366 families living in the town. The racial makeup of the town was 96.8% White, 1.4% African American, 0.3% Native American, 1.1% Asian, 0.2% from other races, and 0.2% from two or more races. Hispanic or Latino of any race were 0.6% of the population.

There were 555 households, of which 14.4% had children under the age of 18 living with them, 59.6% were married couples living together, 4.1% had a female householder with no husband present, 2.2% had a male householder with no wife present, and 34.1% were non-families. 30.6% of all households were made up of individuals, and 16.4% had someone living alone who was 65 years of age or older. The average household size was 2.12 and the average family size was 2.64.

The median age in the town was 58 years. 14.2% of residents were under the age of 18; 4.4% were between the ages of 18 and 24; 10% were from 25 to 44; 39.6% were from 45 to 64; and 32.1% were 65 years of age or older. The gender makeup of the town was 48.2% male and 51.8% female.

2000 census
As of the census of 2000, there were 1,559 people, 661 households, and 473 families living in the town. The racial makeup of the town was 97.69% White, 0.38% African American, 0.13% Native American, 1.03% Asian, and 0.77% from two or more races. Hispanic or Latino of any race were 0.71% of the population. The population of Long Beach boasts a large number of Irish Catholic descent.

There were 661 households, out of which 22.7% had children under the age of 18 living with them, 65.7% were married couples living together, 4.5% had a female householder with no husband present, and 28.3% were non-families. 25.6% of all households were made up of individuals, and 15.4% had someone living alone who was 65 years of age or older.  The average household size was 2.36 and the average family size was 2.84.

In the town, the population was spread out, with 19.9% under the age of 18, 4.9% from 18 to 24, 14.2% from 25 to 44, 35.2% from 45 to 64, and 25.8% who were 65 years of age or older.  The median age was 50 years. For every 100 females, there were 90.6 males.  For every 100 females age 18 and over, there were 90.0 males.

The median income for a household in the town was $71,364, and the median income for a family was $84,532. Males had a median income of $71,563 versus $41,250 for females. The per capita income for the town was $43,159.  None of the families and 0.9% of the population were living below the poverty line, including no under eighteens and none of those over 64.

Education
Long Beach residents are served by the Michigan City Public Library. Long Beach residents may also request a free library card from any La Porte County Public Library branch.

Features
Located on the southeast shore of Lake Michigan, Long Beach is a residential community in a landscape of tree covered dunes. It has a shoreline of approximately 3 miles and a maximum depth of 3/4 miles. Residents tend to be a mixture of permanent residents and individuals visiting Long Beach on weekends or for the summer, the latter group mostly individuals from nearby Chicago.

Long Beach has a town-owned water system and few sewers and sidewalks. It is a part of the Michigan City, Indiana public school system. The government includes a five-member town council, a clerk treasurer, a police department, a volunteer fire department, a park department, and a water board. Long Beach has a very small business center and a golf course/country club.

Long Beach also has the old Long Beach School and uses it as the Community Center, which houses the Long Beach Fitness Center. The Fitness Center features free and machine weights, strength training equipment, and cardio equipment. It also has an aerobics room for fitness classes such as pilates, cardio, and yoga. Personal training is an important part of the fitness programs. Anyone owning property in Long Beach, IN can access the Fitness Center.

Michigan City Transit's Route 3 stops near the town's southern border at Karwick Plaza, immediately north of Karwick Road/Route 12 intersection. It links the town to South Shore Line's Carroll Avenue station  Monday-Saturday and allows its residents to reach downtown Michigan City. The closest Amtrak station is located in downtown Michigan City, at 100 Washington Street.

Notable people
Long Beach was the childhood home of Chief Justice John Roberts and Siri founder Dag Kittlaus. Hunter Biden, son of President Joe Biden, owns a home in Long Beach on Lake Michigan. Frank Lloyd Wright's son John Lloyd Wright lived here and established an architectural practice, designing many houses in the area.

Hal Higdon, noted American distance runner and author, also lives in Long Beach, Indiana.

References

External links
 Town of Long Beach, Indiana website
 Data on Long Beach

Towns in LaPorte County, Indiana
Towns in Indiana